The 2020–21 Croatian First Football League (officially Hrvatski Telekom Prva liga for sponsorship reasons) was the 30th season of the Croatian First Football League, the top national championship for men's association football teams in Croatia, since its establishment in 1992. The season started on 14 August 2020 and finished on 22 May 2021. 

The season began with games being played behind closed doors due to the COVID-19 pandemic.

The league was contested by ten teams.

Teams
On 20 May 2020, Croatian Football Federation announced that the first stage of licensing procedure for 2020–21 season was complete. For the 2020–21 Prva HNL, ten clubs were issued a top level license: Dinamo Zagreb, Gorica, Hajduk Split, Istra 1961, Lokomotiva, Osijek, Rijeka, Slaven Belupo, Šibenik and Varaždin. All of these clubs except Šibenik and Varaždin were also issued a license for participating in UEFA competitions. In the second stage of licensing, clubs that were not licensed in the first stage could appeal on the decision. On 17 June 2020, Croatian Football Federation announced that the licensing procedure for 2020–21 season was complete. Inter Zaprešić and Orijent 1919 were also issued a top level license after appeal process.

The following teams have mathematically secured their place in the 2020–21 Prva HNL.

Stadia and locations

 1 Lokomotiva host their home matches at Stadion Kranjčevićeva. The stadium is originally the home ground of third-level side NK Zagreb.

Personnel and kits

Managerial changes

League table

Results
Each team plays home-and-away against every other team in the league twice, for a total of 36 matches each played.

First round

Second round

Statistics

Top goalscorers

Awards

Annual awards

References

External links
Official website 
Prva HNL at UEFA.com

2020-21
2020–21 in Croatian football
2020–21 in European association football leagues